Howard Henry Baker Jr. (November 15, 1925 June 26, 2014) was an American politician and diplomat who served as a United States Senator from Tennessee from 1967 to 1985. During his tenure, he rose to the rank of Senate Minority Leader and then Senate Majority Leader. A member of the Republican Party, Baker was the first Republican to be elected to the US Senate in Tennessee since the Reconstruction era.

Known in Washington, D.C., as the "Great Conciliator", Baker was often regarded as one of the most successful senators in terms of brokering compromises, enacting legislation, and maintaining civility. For example, he had a lead role in the fashioning and passing of the Clean Air Act of 1970 with Democratic senator Edmund Muskie. A moderate conservative, he was also respected by his Democratic colleagues.

Baker sought the Republican presidential nomination in 1980 but dropped out after the first set of primaries. From 1987 to 1988, he served as White House Chief of Staff for President Ronald Reagan. From 2001 to 2005, he was the United States Ambassador to Japan.

Early life
Baker was born in Huntsville, Tennessee, to Dora Ann (née Ladd) and Howard H. Baker.

His father served as a Republican member of the US House of Representatives from 1951 to 1964, representing Tennessee's Second District. Baker attended The McCallie School in Chattanooga, and after graduating, he attended Tulane University in New Orleans. Baker was an alumnus of the Alpha Sigma Chapter of the Pi Kappa Phi fraternity. During World War II, he trained at a U.S. Navy facility on the campus of the University of the South in Sewanee, Tennessee, in the V-12 Navy College Training Program. He served as a lieutenant in the United States Navy and graduated from the University of Tennessee College of Law in 1949. That year, he was admitted to the Tennessee bar and began his law practice.

Senate career
Baker began his political career in 1964, when he lost to the liberal Democrat Ross Bass in a US Senate election to fill the unexpired term of the late Senator Estes Kefauver. However, Baker only lost by 4.7 percentage points, the closest that a Republican had come to being popularly elected to the Senate from Tennessee.

In the 1966 United States Senate election in Tennessee, Bass lost the Democratic primary to a former Governor of Tennessee, Frank G. Clement, and Baker handily won his Republican primary race against Kenneth Roberts, 112,617 (75.7 percent) to 36,043 (24.2 percent). Baker won the general election, capitalizing on Clement's failure to energize the Democratic base, especially organized labor. He won by a somewhat larger-than-expected margin of 55.7 percent to Clement's 44.2 percent. Baker thus became the first Republican senator from Tennessee since Reconstruction and the first Republican to be popularly elected to the Senate from Tennessee. Baker voted in favor of the Civil Rights Act of 1968 and the confirmation of Thurgood Marshall to the U.S. Supreme Court.

Baker was re-elected in 1972 and again in 1978 and served from January 3, 1967, to January 3, 1985. In 1969, he was already a candidate for the Minority Leadership position that opened up with the death of his father-in-law, Everett Dirksen, but Baker was defeated 24–19 by Hugh Scott. At the beginning of the next Congress, in 1971, Baker ran again, losing again to Scott, 24–20.

When Scott retired, Baker was elected as leader of the Senate Republicans in 1977 by his Republican colleagues, defeating Robert Griffin, 19–18. Baker led the Senate GOP for the last eight years of his tenure, serving two terms as Senate Minority Leader  from 1977 to 1981, and two terms as Senate Majority Leader from 1981 to 1985, a role he transitioned to after the Republicans gained the majority in the Senate in the 1980 elections.

Baker did not seek further re-election and concluded his Senate career in 1985. He was succeeded by Democratic Representative and future Vice President Al Gore.

Nixon administration
President Richard Nixon asked Baker in 1971 to fill one of the two empty seats on the US Supreme Court. When Baker took too long to decide whether he wanted the appointment, Nixon changed his mind and nominated William Rehnquist instead.

Watergate investigation
In 1973 and 1974, Baker was the influential ranking minority member of the Senate Watergate Committee, chaired by Senator Sam Ervin, which investigated the Watergate scandal. Baker famously asked aloud, "What did the President know and when did he know it?" The question is sometimes attributed to being given to him by his counsel and former campaign manager, future US Senator Fred Thompson.

John Dean, former White House counsel to Nixon, revealed to Senate Watergate chief counsel Samuel Dash that Baker had "secret dealings" with the White House during the congressional investigation. Although Baker, as a US senator, would be a juror in any future impeachment trial, Baker was recorded, on February 22, 1973, promising Nixon, "I'm your friend. I'm going to see that your interests are protected."

Watergate reporter Bob Woodward wrote that then "both the majority Democrats and minority Republicans agreed to share all information." Ultimately, one such document shared by Nixon lawyer Fred Buzhardt inadvertently suggested the presence of Nixon's secret taping system.

Presidential campaign
Baker was frequently mentioned by insiders as a possible nominee for Vice President of the United States on a ticket headed by incumbent President Gerald Ford in 1976.  According to many sources, Baker was a frontrunner until he disclosed that his wife, Joy, was a recovered alcoholic. Ford, whose own wife, Betty, was an alcoholic (albeit undisclosed at the time), chose Kansas Senator Bob Dole.

Baker ran for U.S. president in 1980, dropping out of the race for the Republican nomination after losing the Iowa caucuses to George H. W. Bush and the New Hampshire primary to Ronald Reagan even though a Gallup poll had him in second place in the presidential race at 18%, behind Reagan at 41% as late as November 1979. Baker's support of the 1978 Panama Canal Treaties was overwhelmingly unpopular, especially among Republicans, and it was a factor in Reagan's choosing Bush instead as his running mate. Ted Stevens served as Acting Minority Leader during Baker's primary campaign.

Reagan administration
In 1984, Baker received the Presidential Medal of Freedom.

In October 1983, Baker voted in favor of the bill establishing Martin Luther King Jr. Day as a federal holiday.

As a testament to Baker's skill as a negotiator and an honest and amiable broker, Reagan tapped him to serve as Chief of Staff during part of Reagan's second term (1987–1988). Many saw that as a move by Reagan to mend relations with the Senate, which had deteriorated somewhat under the previous chief of staff, Donald Regan. In accepting the appointment, Baker chose to skip another bid for the White House in 1988.

Later life
In 2003, the Howard H. Baker, Jr. Center for Public Policy was set up at the University of Tennessee to honor him. Vice President Dick Cheney gave a speech at the 2005 ground-breaking ceremony for the center's new building. Upon the building's completion in 2008, US Supreme Court Justice Sandra Day O'Connor assisted in the facility's dedication.

In 2007, Baker joined fellow former Senate Majority Leaders Bob Dole, Tom Daschle, and George Mitchell to found the Bipartisan Policy Center, a non-profit think tank that works to develop policies suitable for bipartisan support. He was an advisory board member for the Partnership for a Secure America, a not-for-profit organization dedicated to recreating the bipartisan center in American national security and foreign policy. From 2005 to 2011, Baker was a member of the board of directors of the International Foundation for Electoral Systems, a nonprofit that provides international election support.

From 2005 to his death, Baker served as senior counsel to the law firm of his father and his grandfather, Baker, Donelson, Bearman, Caldwell & Berkowitz.

Baker was an accomplished lifelong photographer. His photographs have often been exhibited and were published in National Geographic, Life, and in the books Howard Baker's Washington (1982), Big South Fork Country (1993), and Scott's Gulf: The Bridgestone/Firestone Centennial Wilderness (2000). In 1993, he received the International Award of the American Society of Photographers, and in 1994, he was elected into the Hall of Fame of the Photo Marketing Association.

Death
On June 26, 2014, Baker died at the age of 88 from complications of a stroke that he had suffered a week earlier. He was in his native Huntsville, Tennessee, with his wife, Nancy, by his side.

Honors
 He received the Golden Plate Award of the American Academy of Achievement in 1973.
 He received the US Senator John Heinz Award for Greatest Public Service by an Elected or Appointed Official in 1981, given out annually by the Jefferson Awards
 He received the Presidential Medal of Freedom in 1984.
 The rotunda at the University of Tennessee College of Law was renamed for Baker.
 While he was delivering a commencement speech during his grandson's graduation at East Tennessee State University, Johnson City, Tennessee, on May 5, 2007, Baker was awarded an honorary doctorate degree.
 He received the Order of the Paulownia Flowers, 2008 (Japan)

Personal life
Baker, a Presbyterian, was married twice. His first wife, Joy Dirksen, with whom he had two daughters, was herself the daughter of former Senate Minority Leader Everett M. Dirksen (R). After his first wife died of cancer in 1993, he remarried in 1996 to fellow U.S. Senator Nancy Landon Kassebaum, who also happened to be the daughter of a Republican politician, Kansas Governor Alfred M. Landon, the unsuccessful Republican nominee for President in 1936 against Democratic incumbent Franklin Roosevelt.

See also
 Snail darter controversy

References

Further reading
 Annis, James. (1995). Howard Baker: Conciliator in an Age of Crises. Lanham, MD: Madison Books. ; .
 Dean, John Wesley. (2001). Rehnquist Choice: The Untold Story of the Nixon Appointment that Redefined the Supreme Court. New York: Free Press. ; .
 U.S. Congress. Senate. Tributes to the Honorable Howard Baker, Jr., of Tennessee in the United States Senate, Upon the Occasion of His Retirement from the Senate. 98th Cong., 2d sess., 1984. Washington: Government Printing Office, 1984.

External links

 Biography from the Howard H. Baker Center for Public Policy at the University of Tennessee
 Citigroup biography
 Howard H. Baker Papers, University of Tennessee Knoxville Libraries 
 
 

1925 births
2014 deaths
20th-century American politicians
21st-century American diplomats
Ambassadors of the United States to Japan
American founders
American Presbyterians
Candidates in the 1980 United States presidential election
Landon family
People from Scott County, Tennessee
Presidential Medal of Freedom recipients
Reagan administration personnel
Recipients of the Order of the Paulownia Flowers
Republican Party United States senators from Tennessee
Sewanee: The University of the South alumni
Spouses of Kansas politicians
Tennessee lawyers
Tennessee Republicans
Tulane University alumni
United States Navy officers
United States Navy personnel of World War II
University of Tennessee alumni
University of Tennessee College of Law alumni
Watergate scandal investigators
White House Chiefs of Staff
Centrism in the United States